Harrison Preserved Smith (November 5, 1876 — August 24, 1947), was an American track and field athlete who competed at the 1900 Summer Olympics in Paris, France.

Smith competed in college for Yale

Smith competed in the 800 metres.  He placed somewhere between fourth and sixth in his first-round (semifinals) heat and did not advance to the final.

References

External links

 De Wael, Herman. Herman's Full Olympians: "Athletics 1900". Accessed 18 March 2006.
 

1876 births
People from Winchester, New Hampshire
Athletes (track and field) at the 1900 Summer Olympics
Olympic track and field athletes of the United States
American male middle-distance runners
1947 deaths
Yale Bulldogs men's track and field athletes
American expatriate sportspeople in England
Sportspeople from New Hampshire